Grégoire Leisen (15 July 1916 – 28 October 1993) was a Luxembourgian racing cyclist. He rode in the 1939 Tour de France.

References

1916 births
1993 deaths
Luxembourgian male cyclists